Ayumi Hamasaki's Countdown Live 2000-2001 A was released on June 20, 2001. The Countdown Live was the album of the second iteration of Ayumi's live show designed to commemorate the end and beginning of the years. The combined discs include 16 songs, with variants of the album released in March and June after the performance.

Track listing

References

Ayumi Hamasaki video albums
2001 video albums
Live video albums
2001 live albums
Albums recorded at the Yoyogi National Gymnasium